Jackson William Jobe (born July 30, 2002) is an American professional baseball pitcher in the Detroit Tigers organization.

Amateur career
Jobe attended Heritage Hall School in Oklahoma City, Oklahoma, where he played football and baseball. He committed to play college baseball at Ole Miss. In 2018, his sophomore year, he was the starting quarterback for the football team and led them to an OSSAA AAA State Championship. During the summer of 2020, he participated in the Perfect Game All-American Classic at Chickasaw Bricktown Ballpark in Oklahoma City. As a senior in 2021, he threw two no-hitters and went 9–1 with a 0.13 ERA, five walks, and 122 strikeouts over  innings pitched, leading Heritage Hall to a state championship. He also batted .469 with six home runs and 38 RBIs. He was subsequently named the Oklahoma Gatorade Player of the Year.

Professional career
Jobe was selected by the Detroit Tigers in the first round with the third overall selection of the 2021 Major League Baseball draft. He signed with the Tigers for a $6.9 million signing bonus.

Jobe made his professional debut in 2022 with the Lakeland Flying Tigers of the Single-A Florida State League. In mid-August, he was promoted to the West Michigan Whitecaps of the High-A Midwest League. Over 21 starts between the two teams, Jobe posted a 4-5 record with a 3.84 ERA and 81 strikeouts over  innings.

Personal life
Jobe's father, Brandt Jobe, is a professional golfer.

References

External links

2002 births
Living people
Baseball pitchers
Baseball players from Oklahoma
Lakeland Flying Tigers players